The 1991–92 Robert Morris Colonials men's basketball team represented Robert Morris University in the 1991–92 NCAA Division I basketball season. Robert Morris was coached by Jarrett Durham and played their home games at the Charles L. Sewall Center in Moon Township, Pennsylvania. The Colonials were members of the Northeast Conference. They finished the season 19–12, 12–4 in NEC play. They won the 1992 Northeast Conference men's basketball tournament to earn the conference's automatic bid to the 1992 NCAA Division I men's basketball tournament. They earned a 16 seed in the West Region and played No. 1 seed UCLA in the first round. The Colonials were beaten 73–53 to end their season.

Roster

Schedule and results

|-
!colspan=9 style=| Regular season

|-
!colspan=9 style=| NEC tournament

|-
!colspan=9 style=| NCAA tournament

Awards and honors
Myron Walker – NEC Player of the Year

References

Robert Morris Colonials
Robert Morris
Robert Morris Colonials men's basketball seasons
Robert
Robert